By George (subtitled George Cables Plays the Music of George Gershwin) is an album of George Gershwin tunes by pianist George Cables recorded in 1987 and released on the Contemporary label. The album was Cable's third for the label and released in commemoration of the fiftieth anniversary of Gershwin's death.

Reception

Scott Yanow of AllMusic said "The fact that he was able to come up with fresh statements on these warhorses (and still stay melodic) says a great deal about Cables's inventiveness." The Penguin Guide to Jazz wrote that the album was "richly sophisticated, and the solo performances of 'Embraceable You' and 'Someone to Watch over Me' are excellent examples of his innate rhythmic sense."

Track listing
All compositions by George Gershwin and Ira Gershwin except as indicated
 "Bess, You Is My Woman Now" – 7:26 		
 "My Man's Gone Now" (George Gershwin, DuBose Heyward) – 7:31
 "I Got Rhythm" – 4:36
 "Embraceable You" – 6:51
 "Someone to Watch over Me" – 7:06
 "A Foggy Day" – 5:53 		
 "Summertime" (Gershwin, Heyward) – 4:55 Bonus track on CD reissue

Personnel
George Cables – piano
John Heard – bass (tracks 1–3, 6 & 7) 
Ralph Penland – drums (tracks 1–3, 6 & 7)

References 

Contemporary Records albums
George Cables albums
1987 albums
George and Ira Gershwin tribute albums